Kenneth V. Buzbee (born November 30, 1937) is an American politician and businessman. Buzbee served as a Democratic member of the Illinois Senate from 1973 to 1985.

Born in Anna, Illinois, Buzbee received his bachelor's degree in communication and his master's degree in political science from Southern Illinois University. He served in the United States Marine Corps and was commissioned a lieutenant colonel. He worked for the Illinois Eastern Community Colleges and for the Illinois Secretary of State. Buzbee served in the Illinois Senate from 1973 to 1985. While in the Senate, Buzbee was a member of the Democratic Study Group, a group of between eight and eleven independent Democrats dubbed the "Crazy 8" by political observers. With the Crazy 8, he was able to leverage himself a position as the chairman of the Appropriations II committee. In 1984, Buzbee lost the Democratic primary for the United States House of Representatives to Kenneth J. Gray After his time in the Senate, he would lobbyist representing the City of Chicago during Harold Washington's mayoralty.

In 1992, Buzbee ran for Illinois Senate in the 58th district against Republican incumbent Ralph A. Dunn. Despite the apparent Democratic lean of the district, Dunn defeated Buzbee's comeback effort. Upon taking office as Illinois Secretary of State in 1999, Jesse White hired Buzbee to serve as the Director of Business Services.

Notes

1937 births
Living people
People from Anna, Illinois
Military personnel from Illinois
Southern Illinois University alumni
Businesspeople from Illinois
Democratic Party Illinois state senators